Wandle Park tram stop is a stop adjacent to Wandle Park in the London Borough of Croydon in the southern suburbs of London. It serves the residential area between central Croydon and Waddon.

The tram stop is located on a double track section of line, with platforms on either side of the track. Immediately to the east of the stop, the line reduces to single track and rises on a steep gradient in order to pass over the railway line on a bridge.

Until December 2019, it was a request stop in both directions. It is now a compulsory stop for trams towards Croydon, but a request stop for trams towards Wimbledon.

References

Tramlink stops in the London Borough of Croydon
Railway stations in Great Britain opened in 2000